Strata is an American rock band from Campbell, California, formed in 2000, when guitarist Ryan Hernandez and singer Eric Victorino met and left their previous bands. Bassist Hrag Chanchanian and drummer Patrick Spain completed the line-up under the band's original name, Downside. The band released an EP entitled "For Testing Purposes" and an album called Sleep in 2001. Garnering major label attention early on, Downside signed a development deal with Capitol Records, during which time they replaced drummer Patrick Spain with Adrian Robison and recorded a collection of songs called, The Industry Is Outnumbered... Their Factories Are Burning Down, much of which would become their major label debut, under the name Strata, on Wind-Up Records in 2003.

They released two albums with Wind-up Records, before disbanding after the departure of vocalist Eric Victorino on 19 January 2008. In 2014, the band reunited, minus Adrian Robison on drums, replaced by longtime friend of the band Andy Bailey.

History
In 2001, under the name Downside, the band released the nine-track EP Sleep. Issues surrounding the name being trademarked by another band caused the band to change their name to Strata. In 2003, after changing the band name to Strata, they released the seven-track EP Now the Industry is Outnumbered. Their Factories are Burning Down.

Self-titled album (2004)
In 2004, they released their first full-length album on Wind-up Records.  The album was featured on the Billboard Top Heatseekers chart, where it peaked at number forty-one. The album contained a lot of revised material from their previous Internet-only release When It's All Burning, and EP Now the Industry is Outnumbered. Their Factories are Burning Down'.  The album spawned two singles: "The Panic" and "Never There (She Stabs)," which were accompanied by music videos.  Another song, "Piece By Piece", was featured on the soundtrack for the movie The Punisher, and the video game Madden NFL 2005. "Never There (She Stabs)" was featured on the soundtrack of the movie Elektra.  During 2004, the band toured with Alien Ant Farm, dredg, Sno-Core, Smile Empty Soul, Finger Eleven, Nonpoint, and Skindred.

Strata filmed a music video for the single "The Panic" in Romania, with the film crew who had recently filmed the movie Cold Mountain. In 2005, the band was set to begin a tour with Nonpoint when singer Eric Victorino developed polyps and nodes on his vocal cords, rendering him virtually mute and forcing Strata to drop off the tour. Victorino stayed in New York City for two weeks to undergo treatment, at which time he wrote most of the lyrics to songs that would become the band's next release. The remaining band and crew drove home to California, stopping in numerous cities to go bowling with fans who had tickets to see the canceled tour dates.

The End of the World (2007)
In the summer of 2006, Strata headed to Southern England to begin recording Strata Presents The End Of The World, with producer Sam Williams, at the Sawmills Studio in Cornwall.

On 17 July 2007, the band released their second full-length album, titled Strata Presents The End of the World. The album spawned two singles, "Cocaine (We're All Going to Hell)" and "Stay Young".  Critics noted a departure from the band's previous nu-metal grunge sound, into a more 'atmospheric' and 'epic' sound, similar to that of My Chemical Romance or the Mars Volta.

In September 2007, Strata toured with Kaddisfly. The tour was their first co-headlining tour and covered most of the United States West Coast.   Between 29 November 2007 and 16 December 2007, Strata toured the West Coast of the U.S., beginning in Orangevale, California, and finishing in San Francisco.

Hiatus, disbandment, and reunion (2008–2014)
On January 19, 2008, vocalist Eric Victorino announced that he was leaving the band, stating that he wanted to explore his creativity, and encouraging fans to "let this be a time of growth and evolution, a celebration of the past eight years and anticipation of what's to come."  The band was subsequently disbanded, with Hernandez and Robison forming a new project titled Beta State.  Victorino later started a new band named The Limousines, and also published two books; a short story and poetry compilation titled Coma Therapy, and Trading Shadows for Sunshine: A Loosely Chronicled Descent into the World of Exercise Bikes and Antidepressants. On September 17, 2010, Beta State released their full-length album entitled Stars.  On August 30, 2011, a reissue of Sleep was released to celebrate the tenth anniversary of the release of the EP, which includes previously unreleased songs, demos, and acoustic songs.

In early 2014, Victorino and Hernandez began posting pictures and videos of the members practicing songs from both of their studio albums as well as setlists, causing rumor of a reunion. Strata has begun playing shows again, and officially announced their reunion in June 2014. Drummer Adrian Robison was invited to join, but declined. Longtime friend of the band Andy Bailey has joined on drums.

The Sawmill Sessions EP (2015–2017)
Without announcement on the band's official social media page, Strata released a six-song EP called The Sawmill Sessions on March 8, 2016 to iTunes, among other digital retailers. Many of the EP's tracks were reworked versions of songs previously released as demos on the 10-year anniversary edition of Sleep, as well as an alternate version of "Coma Therapy."

 Return from Hiatus (2020) 
On 28 July 2020, the band confirmed their return with a new single titled "Around the Bend."'' The band confirmed that this would be their first track of 2020, which was self-recorded, self-produced, and self-released. "Around the Bend" was released via Bandcamp, which included a podcast-style breakdown of the making of "Around the Bend," featuring Eric Victorino and Ryan Hernandez, as well as an alternate acoustic version of the song.

Members

Current lineup
Ryan Hernandez – guitar, vocals, synthesizer, piano (2000-2008, 2014-)
Hrag Chanchanian – bass, piano (2000-2008, 2014-)
Eric Victorino – vocals, guitar (2000-2008, 2014-)
Jonathan Poso – piano, synthesizer (2017-)

Former members
Patrick Spain - drums (2000-2003)
Adrian Robison – drums, programming (2003-2008)
Andy Bailey – drums (2014-2019)
Jim Leadbetter - drums (2019-2020)
Bailey Lindskog - bass (2000-2003)

Discography

Other independent releases:

"For testing purposes V1.0" (2000)
track list:
1. "Sapphire"
2. "Flawless"
3. "Die Together"
4. "Champagne"

"Falling Asleep" [2000]
1. "Medicinal"
2. "Sleep"

Breather Promo disc [2001]
1. "Off Axis (Colour)"
2. "Recover"
 Enhanced portion contains live "Sleep" video

Downside Demo [2002]
1. "I Will Breathe Fire"
2. "She Stabs"
3. "The Panic"

Klown Demos [2002]
1. "The Panic"
2. "New Eternal"
3. "I Will Breathe Fire"
4. "In A Sweet Dream"
5. "She Stabs"
6. "Sleep"
7. "Just Like Silk"

"When It's All Burning" (2003)
track list:
1. "In/Evolve"
2. "When It's All Burning"
3. "You Are Eternal"
4. "White Hot Light"
5. "I Will Breathe Fire"
6. "Piece By Piece"
7. "Trust Kill Trust"
8. "The Panic"
9. "Waiting"
10. "Never There"
11. "Just Like Silk"
12. "We've Changed"
13. "In A Sweet Dream"
14. "Out/Slow To Home"

Singles

References

External links
 Official site

Alternative rock groups from California
Musical groups from the San Francisco Bay Area
Wind-up Records artists